Vishwaguru is a 2017 Malayalam-language Indian biographical film directed by Vijeesh Mani and co-produced with A. V. Anoop. It is based on the life of Narayana Guru, the film features Purushothaman Kainakkari, Gandhiyan Chacha Sivarajan, Kaladharan and Kalanilayam Ramachandran in lead roles.

The film was made and released in 51 hours and 2 minutes following a "script to screen" rule.

Summary
Vishwaguru is based on the life of Narayana Guru, a social reformer of India who led a reform movement in Kerala, rejected casteism, and promoted new values of spiritual freedom and social equality.

Cast
Purushothaman Kainakkari - Sree Narayana Guru
Gandhiyan Chacha Sivarajan - Mahatma Gandhi
K.Kaladharan - Rabindranath Tagore
Kalanilayam Ramachandran - Kumaran Asan
Swamy Sachithananda - Swamy Sachithananda
Harikrishnan - Dr.Palpu
K.P.A.C. Leelakrishnan - Grand father
Baby Pavithra - Grand daughter Pavithra
Roji P. Kurian - Foreign Devotee

Script to screen time
The film was scripted, created, and released in 51 hours and two minutes, which was recorded in Guinness World Records as the fastest film produced.

References

External links
 

2017 films
2010s Malayalam-language films
Indian biographical films
Biographical films about religious leaders
Biographical films about philosophers
Guinness World Records
2010s biographical films
2017 directorial debut films